Završje is a village in Požega-Slavonia County, Croatia. It is administered as a part of the Brestovac municipality.
Its population was 323 at the national census of 2011.

Sources

Populated places in Požega-Slavonia County